Lloyd Henry is an American politician who served in the New York City Council from the 45th district from 1994 to 2001.

References

Living people
New York City Council members
New York (state) Democrats
Year of birth missing (living people)